Kelly Zeeman (born 19 November 1993) is a Dutch professional footballer. She plays as a defensive midfielder or centre-back for Eredivisie club Ajax and the Netherlands national team.

Club career
Zeeman played for Telstar in the BeNe League in the 2012–13 season. In June 2013, she moved to Ajax along with Claudia van den Heiligenberg.

In January 2021, Zeeman joined SC Heerenveen on a loan deal until 30 June 2021. This made her the first Dutch player to be loaned out in Eredivisie.

International career
Zeeman earned her first cap for the national team on 9 February 2013, in a 3–2 friendly win against Belgium.

In June 2017, she was called up by head coach Sarina Wiegman to be part of the Netherlands squad for the UEFA Women's Euro 2017 on home soil. Zeeman made two substitute appearances during the tournament, which the Dutch won to claim their first Women's Euro trophy.

Career statistics

International

Honours

Club
Ajax
 Women's Eredivisie: 2016–17, 2017–18
 KNVB Women's Cup: 2013–14, 2016–17, 2017–18, 2018–19, 2021–22

International
Netherlands
 UEFA Women's Championship: 2017

References

External links
 
Senior national team profile at Onsoranje.nl (in Dutch)
Under-19 national team profile at Onsoranje.nl (in Dutch)
Under-17 national team profile at Onsoranje.nl (in Dutch)
Under-16 national team profile at Onsoranje.nl (in Dutch)

1993 births
Living people
Dutch women's footballers
Netherlands women's international footballers
Women's association football midfielders
Women's association football defenders
Eredivisie (women) players
Telstar (women's football club) players
AFC Ajax (women) players
Footballers from Amsterdam
UEFA Women's Championship-winning players
Knights of the Order of Orange-Nassau
UEFA Women's Euro 2017 players